Mosel/Rhein-Hunsrück is an electoral constituency (German: Wahlkreis) represented in the Bundestag. It elects one member via first-past-the-post voting. Under the current constituency numbering system, it is designated as constituency 200. It is located in central Rhineland-Palatinate, comprising the Cochem-Zell district, Rhein-Hunsrück-Kreis district, and the southern part of the Bernkastel-Wittlich district.

Mosel/Rhein-Hunsrück was created for the inaugural 1949 federal election. Since 2021, it has been represented by Marlon Bröhr of the Christian Democratic Union (CDU).

Geography
Mosel/Rhein-Hunsrück is located in central Rhineland-Palatinate. As of the 2021 federal election, it comprises the entirety of the Cochem-Zell and Rhein-Hunsrück-Kreis districts as well as, from the Bernkastel-Wittlich district, the municipality of Morbach, the Verbandsgemeinden of Bernkastel-Kues and Thalfang am Erbeskopf, and the municipalities of Burg (Mosel), Enkirch, Irmenach, Lötzbeuren, Starkenburg, and Traben-Trarbach from the Traben-Trarbach Verbandsgemeinde.

History
Mosel/Rhein-Hunsrück was created in 1949, then known as Cochem. It acquired its current name in the 2002 election. In the 1949 election, it was Rhineland-Palatinate constituency 4 in the numbering system. In the 1953 through 1976 elections, it was number 151. In the 1980 through 1998 elections, it was number 149. In the 2002 election, it was number 203. In the 2005 election, it was number 202. In the 2009 and 2013 elections, it was number 201. Since the 2017 election, it has been number 200.

Originally, the constituency comprised the districts of Cochem, Zell, Simmern, and Bernkastel. In the 1972 through 1998 elections, it comprised the Cochem-Zell district; the Verbandsgemeinden of Kastellaun, Kirchberg, Rheinböllen, and Simmern/Hunsrück from the Rhein-Hunsrück-Kreis district; and the municipality of Morbach and the Verbandsgemeinden of Bernkastel-Kues, Neumagen-Dhron, Thalfang am Erbeskopf, and Traben-Trarbach from the Bernkastel-Wittlich district. It acquired its current borders in the 2002 election, although when the former Verbandsgemeinde of Neumagen-Dhron was merged into the Traben-Trarbach Verbandsgemeinde in 2012, its area was not incorporated into the constituency.

Members
The constituency has been held continuously by the Christian Democratic Union (CDU) since its creation. It was first represented by Paul Gibbert from 1949 to 1969. Klaus Bremm then served from 1969 to 1976. He was succeeded by Waltrud Will-Feld, who was representative until 1990. Peter Bleser was elected in 1990 and served until 2021, a total of eight consecutive terms. He was succeeded by Marlon Bröhr in 2021.

Election results

2021 election

2017 election

2013 election

2009 election

References

Federal electoral districts in Rhineland-Palatinate
1949 establishments in West Germany
Constituencies established in 1949
Cochem-Zell
Rhein-Hunsrück-Kreis
Bernkastel-Wittlich